Håvard Bøkko (born 2 February 1987) is a Norwegian former speed skater, and the premier skater from his country since 2008, with 32 national championships and thirteen international medals. He had junior results similar to those of Sven Kramer, Gianni Romme and Eric Heiden from the early 1980s before the clap skate. He is the older brother of Hege Bøkko.

Speed skating career
In 2006, Bøkko was the Junior World Champion, winning the three longest distances. In the European Speedskating Championships he won the bronze in 2006, was no. 4 in 2007, and caught the silver in 2008 and 2009 (on both occasions trailing Sven Kramer). In the World Allround Speedskating Championships he was no. 4 in 2007 and won the overall silver medal, after Sven Kramer, in both 2008 and 2009. At the latter occasion he managed the feat of reaching the podium for each of the four distances (silver, gold, silver, silver for 500, 1500, 5000, 10000 m). He went on to win the silver medal in the 2009 World Single Distance Championships 5000 and the 10000 m, only beaten by Kramer.

In November 2005 he broke three junior world records in two weeks. On 5 November he raced 3000 metres on 3:43.66, on the 13th he raced 5000 metres in 6:18.93 and on the 18th he broke  the 1500 metre record with 1:46.07. As of March 2009, he is ranked 4th in the Speedskating Adelskalender and is the highest ranking Norwegian on this list.

Bøkko holds the Norwegian records in the 1500 m (1:42.67), the 5000 m (6:09.94), the 10000 m (12:53.89) and the allround samalogue event (145.761), and is with Sverre Haugli and Henrik Christiansen also on the team that holds the national record 3:42.88 in the Team Pursuit event. His 3:39.28 result from February 2009 is the 3rd best 3000 m time ever (after Eskil Ervik and Chad Hedrick). Also, as of March 2009, only six skaters (Shani Davis, Denny Morrison, Trevor Marsicano, Erben Wennemars, Simon Kuipers and Chad Hedrick) have skated the 1500 m faster than Bøkko's 1:42.67, and only four skaters (Sven Kramer, Enrico Fabris, Carl Verheijen and Chad Hedrick) have skated the 5000 m faster than his 6:09.94.

Development

Records

World records

Personal records

Source: SpeedskatingResults.com

Bøkko is currently in 6th position in the adelskalender with 145.661 points. From 6 March 2009 to 3 March 2019, he held a personal best 4th place.

References

External links
 
 
 
 

1987 births
Norwegian male speed skaters
Speed skaters at the 2006 Winter Olympics
Speed skaters at the 2010 Winter Olympics
Speed skaters at the 2014 Winter Olympics
Speed skaters at the 2018 Winter Olympics
Olympic speed skaters of Norway
Olympic medalists in speed skating
Olympic gold medalists for Norway
Olympic bronze medalists for Norway
Medalists at the 2010 Winter Olympics
Medalists at the 2018 Winter Olympics
People from Hol
Living people
World Allround Speed Skating Championships medalists
World Single Distances Speed Skating Championships medalists
Sportspeople from Viken (county)